Roger Fisher (1936 - 2021) was an English concert organist and pianist from Woodford, Essex, England.

He attended Bancroft's School and went on to the Royal College of Music, studying with Herbert Howells and Harold Darke. He gained ARCM, FRCO and CHM diplomas, and also won the Geoffrey Tankard Prize for Organ playing. He went on to Christ Church, Oxford, having gained an organ scholarship.

He lived in Hereford and was the Assistant Organist at Hereford Cathedral and Assistant Lecturer in Music at the College of Education. In 1967, he became Organist and Master of the Choristers at Chester Cathedral. In 1970, he started recording for occasional BBC broadcasts and record labels such as EMI, Decca and RCA. He retired from the Cathedral in 1996 and moved to live in Wales.

Recordings
 Jubilate Deo - Music for Men's Voices (The Lay Clerks of Chester Cathedral)
 Roger Fisher at Wells Cathedral
 Roger Fisher Plays French Organ Music
 Edwin H Lemare Symphony No 1 and Other Romantic Rarities
 Organ Music from Chichester Cathedral
 A Celebration of Organ Music from Hull City Hall
 English Organ Music from Hull City Hall
 Roger Fisher plays the Cavaillé-Coll Organ in the Parr Hall, Warrington (2 recordings)
 Ystym Colwyn Hall
 Whitlock Organ Music
 The Land of the Mountain and the Flood
 Harold Darke - Organ Works
 Organ Music from the Parish Church of St Laurence, Ludlow
 Walford Davies
 Klassik & Romantik
 Early Twentieth Century German Organ Music
 Twentieth Century British Organ Music
 Romantic Masterpieces for Organ
 The Romantic Organ - Chester Cathedral
 Music at the Old Chapel
 Organ Showcase from Hull City Hall (Volume 2) - Music by J S Bach & Louis Vierne
 Organ Showcase from Hull City Hall (Volume 4) - Music by Dupré, Franck & Widor
 Organ Centenary: Pietermaritzburg City Hall

References

English classical organists
Cathedral organists
Fellows of the Royal College of Organists
Living people
21st-century organists
21st-century British male musicians
1936 births